Brazil has a multi-party system since 1979, when the country's military dictatorship disbanded an enforced two-party system and allowed the creation of multiple parties.

Above the broad range of political parties in Brazilian Congress, the Workers' Party (PT), the Brazilian Democratic Movement (MDB), Liberal Party (PL), the Progressives (PP) and the Brazil Union (UNIÃO) together control the absolute majority of seats in the Senate and Chamber of Deputies. Smaller parties often make alliances with at least one of these five major parties. The number of political parties reached 35 on its apex on 2018. However, an Electoral threshold system introduced on 2017 has resulted in the culling and merger of many parties, as the threshold cuts access to party subsidies and the free party political broadcasts.

Brazilian parties have access to party subsidies in form of the Fundo Partidário and the Fundo Eleitoral for elections. And a system of free party political broadcasts during election time known as the horário eleitoral gratuito.

Since 1982 Brazilian political parties have been given an electoral number to make it easier for illiterate people to vote. Initially, it was a one-digit number: 1 for PDS, 2 for PDT, 3 for PT, 4 for PTB, and 5 for PMDB. When it became clear that there was going to be more than nine parties, two-digit numbers were assigned, with the first five parties having a "1" added to their former one-digit number (PDS becoming number 11, PDT 12, PT 13, PTB 14, and PMDB 15). They also have official abbreviations. Political parties often change their names but can retain their number.

Current parties

Non-registered parties

Waiting for registration in the Superior Electoral Court:

Former and historical parties

Merged parties of New Republic (since 1979)

Other former parties of New Republic (since 1979)

Military dictatorship (1965–1979)

Fourth Republic (1945–1965)

Old Republic and Second Republic (1891–1937)

Empire (before 1891)

See also 
 Centrão
 List of political parties by country
 Liberalism in Brazil

References 

Brazil

Political parties
Political parties
Brazil